The following is a list of Australian netball teams that have been premiers and minor premiers of the top level national league. Since 2017, this has been Suncorp Super Netball. Previous top level national leagues have included the Esso/Mobil Superleague, the Commonwealth Bank Trophy and the ANZ Championship.

Esso/Mobil Superleague
The Esso Superleague, later known as the Mobil Superleague, was the top level national Australian netball league between 1985 and 1996. The league was Australia's first national netball league.

Grand finals
Esso Superleague

Mobil Superleague

Minor premierships

Australian State Netball League
Australian State Netball League

Grand finals

Commonwealth Bank Trophy
The Commonwealth Bank Trophy, also referred to as the National Netball League, was the top level national Australian netball league between 1997 and 2007.

Grand finals

Minor premierships

ANZ Championship
The ANZ Championship, also known as the Trans-Tasman Netball League featured teams from both Australia and New Zealand. Between 2008 and 2016, it was the top-level league in both countries.

Grand finals

Minor premierships

Suncorp Super Netball
Since 2017, the top level national league in Australia has been Suncorp Super Netball.

Grand finals

Minor premierships

Winners by state
Victoria

New South Wales

South Australia

Queensland

New Zealand

Western Australia

Notes 
  Australian Institute of Sport played in the New South Wales State League.
  Sydney Energy played the 1993, 1994 and 1995 seasons as Sydney Electricity.

References

Premierships
Netball
Netball